Oak Ridges—Markham was a provincial electoral district in Ontario, Canada, that was represented in the Legislative Assembly of Ontario between the 2007 provincial election and the 2018 provincial election. Its population in 2006 was 169,645, with 136,755 electors, the highest of any riding in Ontario. It was the fastest growing riding in the province, having experienced a 52.5% increase in population from 2001 to 2006.

The district covered part of the suburbs north of Toronto. It included the town of Whitchurch–Stouffville, most of the township of King (excepting extreme northeast) the northern portions of the town of Richmond Hill (including all of Oak Ridges), and the northern and eastern portions of the city of Markham.

The electoral district was created in 2004 52.5% from Oak Ridges, 30% from Markham, 13% from Vaughan—King—Aurora district and 4.5% from York North riding.

In 2018, the district was dissolved into Markham—Stouffville, King—Vaughan, Markham—Unionville and Aurora—Oak Ridges—Richmond Hill.

Demographics
Communities in Oak Ridges—Markham are the destination for many immigrants to Canada, composing about 41.6% of the population, or about 70,000 of its residents. For 72,440 residents, neither English nor French, the official languages of Canada, is their mother tongue, though most have knowledge of English (148,975), French (160), or both (12,885). Most immigrants become citizens, as 11,155 immigrants were not Canadian citizens as of the Canada 2006 Census.

The primarily urban district has a low proportion of Aboriginal residents compared to other parts of Canada, with just 625 people identifying themselves of such descent. It is also home to 70,070 residents who identify themselves as visible minorities, more than half of which are Chinese Canadians and about 20% are Black Canadians.

At the 2006 census, the participation rate of residents in the work force was 71.3%, and the electoral district unemployment rate was 5%, below the national average of 6.3%.

The district was the second-largest electoral district in Ontario by population, next to Brampton West which had 170,422 residents at the 2006 census.

Geography
The riding consists of part of the Regional Municipality of York including:
the Town of Whitchurch-Stouffville;
the part of the Township of King to the south of Highway No. 9;
the part of the Town of Richmond Hill to the north and east of Gamble Road, Yonge Street, and Elgin Mills Road East; and
the part of the City of Markham to the north and east of 16th Avenue, McCowan Road, Highway No. 7, and 9th Line.

Communities represented
Ballantrae
Gormley
Kettleby
King City
Lake Wilcox
Lloydtown
Markham
Nobleton
Oak Ridges
Pottageville
Schomberg
Snowball
Temperanceville
Whitchurch–Stouffville

Members of Provincial Parliament

Election results

2007 electoral reform referendum

References

Sources
Elections Ontario Past Election Results

Former provincial electoral districts of Ontario
Politics of King, Ontario
Politics of Markham, Ontario
Politics of Richmond Hill, Ontario
Whitchurch-Stouffville